Dhruva (Sanskrit: ध्रुव, lit. "unshakeable, immovable, or fixed") was an ascetic devotee of Vishnu mentioned in the Vishnu Purana and the Bhagavata Purana.

The Sanskrit term dhruva nakshatra (ध्रुव नक्षत्र, "polar star") has been used for Pole Star in the Mahabharata, personified as son of Uttānapāda and grandson of Manu, even though Polaris 
at the likely period of the recension of the text of the Mahabharata was still several degrees away from the celestial pole.

Narrative

Dhruva was born as son of the King Uttānapāda (the son of Svayambhuva Manu) and his wife Suniti. The king also had another son Uttama, born to his second queen Suruchi, who was the preferred object of his affection. Once, when Dhruva was a child of five years of age, he saw his younger brother, Uttama sitting on his father's lap at the King's throne. Suruchi, who was jealous of the older son from the first wife (since he - Dhruva - would be heir to  throne, and not Suruchi's son), cruelly scolded young Dhruva for his efforts to sit on his father's lap. When Dhruva protested and asked if he could not be allowed to sit on his father's lap, Suruchi berated him saying, 'Go ask god to be born in my womb. Only then will you have the privilige'.
Suniti - being of gentle nature and now the lesser favorite wife - tried to console the distraught child, but Dhruva was determined to hear of his fate from the Lord himself. Seeing his firm resolve, his mother bade him farewell as he set out on a lonely journey to the forest. Dhruva was determined to seek for himself his rightful place, and noticing this resolve, the divine sage Narada appeared before him and tried to desist him from assuming a severe austerity upon himself at such an early age. But, Dhruva's fierce determination knew no bounds, and the astonished sage guided him towards his goal by teaching him the rituals and mantras to meditate on when seeking lord Vishnu. The one mantra which Narada taught and which was effectively used by Dhruva was  Om Namo Bhagavate Vasudevaya. Having been advised, Dhruva started his meditation, and went without food and water for six months. The austerity of his tapasya shook the heavens and Vishnu appeared before him, but the child would not open his eyes because he was still merged in his inner vision of Vishnu's form described to him by Narada. Vishnu had to adopt a strategy of causing that inner vision to disappear. Immediately Dhruva opened his eyes, and, seeing outside what he had been seeing all along in his mental vision, bowed down before Vishnu. But he could not utter a single word. Vishnu touched Dhruva's right cheek by his divine conch and that sparked off his speech. Out poured forth a beautiful poem praising Vishnu in 12 powerful verses, which together are called Dhruva-stuti.

Vishnu Purana gives a slightly different account here. When Vishnu was pleased with Dhruva's tapasya (penance) and asked him to ask for a varadāna (grant of wishes), he asked for the varadāna of a knowledge of stuti (hymn). Other persons would have asked for worldly or heavenly pleasures, or for moksha at most, but Dhruva had no personal desire. Renunciation of all desires is regarded to be essential for eternal peace in Hinduism: this is the meaning of Dhruva-pada. That was the reason why the Saptarshis decided to give Dhruva the most revered seat of a star - the Pole Star.

Having spent a long time in Vishnu's remembrance he even forgot the objective of his tapasya, and only asked for a life in memory of Vishnu. Pleased by his tapasya, Vishnu granted his wish and further decreed that he would attain Dhruva-pada: the state where he would become a celestial body which would not even be touched by the Maha Pralaya.

Dhruva returned to his kingdom, to be warmly received by his family, and attained the crown at the age of six. He ruled for many decades in a fair and just manner.

See also
 Nachiketa
 Saptarshi
 Dru yoga

References

Sources

External links
 Dhruva's story in the Vishnu Purana
 Dhruva's story from the Bhagavatam
 Abridged Translation from the Vishnu Purana

Characters in Hindu mythology